, or Mount Dodogamine, is located in the northern part of the city of Gifu, Gifu Prefecture, Japan it is  in height, making it the tallest mountain in the city. The mountain's small valley includes Matsuo Pond and Hagi Falls.

Reaching the summit
There are six routes for reaching the summit:
 Mitahora Kōbō Route (三田洞弘法ルート)
 Matsuo Pond Route (松尾池ルート Matsuoike Rūto)
 Shōrai Danchi Route (松籟団地ルート)
 Nishiyama Yongō-fun Route (西山4号墳ルート)
 Nishiyama Danchi Route (西山団地ルート)
 Suwa Shrine Route (諏訪神社ルート Suwa Jinja Rūto)

The Tōkai Nature Path (東海自然歩道 Tōkai Shizen Hodō) runs through Mount Dodo, using different routes to climb up and down the mountain.

Summit attractions
 Mount Haku Observatory (白山展望台 Hakusan Tenbōdai)
 Nagara River Observatory (長良川展望台 Nagaragawa Tenbōdai)

References

External links

Gifu
Dodo, Mount